The 1964 Davis Cup was the 53rd edition of the Davis Cup, the most important tournament between national teams in men's tennis. 32 teams entered the Europe Zone, 10 teams entered the Eastern Zone, and 7 teams entered the America Zone. Bulgaria and South Vietnam made their first appearances in the tournament.

Due to the increase in the number of entries, a number of changes were made for this year's tournament. In the Eastern Zone the participating countries were split into two sub-zones, with the winner of each sub-zone playing to determine which team moved to the Inter-Zonal Zone. In the Europe Zone the previous year's semifinalists were no longer granted byes into the second round, however seeding was still in place to ensure that these countries could not meet before the semifinals.

Australia defeated Chile in the America Zone final, the Philippines defeated India in the Eastern Inter-Zonal final, and Sweden defeated France in the Europe Zone final. In the Inter-Zonal Zone, Sweden defeated the Philippines in the semifinal, and were then defeated by Australia in the final. Australia defeated the defending champions the United States in the Challenge Round. The final was played at the Harold Clark Courts in Cleveland, Ohio, United States on 25–28 September.

America Zone

Draw

Final
Australia vs. Chile

Eastern Zone

Zone A

Zone B

Eastern Inter-Zonal Final
Philippines vs. India

Europe Zone

Draw

Final
Sweden vs. France

Inter-Zonal Zone

Draw

Semifinals
Sweden vs. Philippines

Final
Sweden vs. Australia

Challenge Round
United States vs. Australia

References

External links
Davis Cup Official Website

 
Davis Cups by year
Davis Cup
Davis Cup
Davis Cup
Davis Cup